Amendeuix-Oneix is a commune in the Pyrénées-Atlantiques department in the Nouvelle-Aquitaine region in southwestern France.

The inhabitants of the commune are known as Amendüztar.

Geography

Amendeuix-Oneix is located some 50 km east by south-east of Bayonne and 40 km south-west of Orthez in the Mixe country in the former Basque province of Lower Navarre. The village can be accessed by the D124 road from Garris in the west passing northeast to the village then continuing north to join the D29. The D11 road also passes through the south of the commune from Garris to Saint-Palais. The small D511 road links the D11 to the D124 within the commune.

Hydrography
Located in the Drainage divide of the Adour, the northern part of the eastern border of the commune is the Bidouze which flows north to join the Adour west of Peyrehorade. The southern part of the eastern border consists of the Joyeuse with many tributaries rising in the commune including the Algueruko erreka, the Sallarteko erreka, and the Soubiaga erreka. The Aitzeguerris rises just south of the village and flows into the Bidouze.

Localities and hamlets

Amendeuix
Arkausia
Arlania
Arrosteguia
Autrichia
Berhabia
Bidainia
Bordaberria
Candelenia
Errecartia
Etcheberria
Etchetto
Eyheraetcheberry
Gaponteguia
Goitia
Guillenteguia
Hiriberry
Inchaursague
Iribarnia
Jauberria
Jauhenia
Landaçaharia
Larregoyen
Lauhiteya
Mantunia
Oneix
Oyhamburia
Peco-Berthoua
Postateya
Sabrenia
Salla
Vivienborda

Toponymy
The current Basque name is Amendüze-Unaso. Jean-Baptiste Orpustan suggested that Oneix means the 'place of abundant hills'. Brigitte Jobbé-Duval however suggested that Oneix came from the Basque Unanu which means the Asphodelus (plant) and signifies a "place where the asphodelus is abundant. She also suggested that the origin of Amendeuix was Aquitane-Roman to designate a noble domain.

The following table details the origins of the commune name and other names in the commune.

Sources:
Orpustan: Jean-Baptiste Orpustan, New Basque Toponymy
Raymond: Topographic Dictionary of the Department of Basses-Pyrenees, 1863, on the page numbers indicated in the table. 
Cassini: Cassini Map from 1750

Origins:
Notaries: Notaries of Labastide-Villefranche
Pamplona: Titles of Pamplona
Pau: Titles of the Chamber of the Counts of Pau
Biscay: Martin Biscay

History
In the 16th century (1594), evidence of witchcraft was reported by an admonition to the States of Navarre by the Prosecutor of Mixe (together with those of Arberoue, Ostabaret, Irissarry, Ossès, Baigorri, and La Bastide-Clairence), who complained of a lack of prosecution and requesting that each town or district of Lower Navarre elect "two men of good character who are not suspects to find and punish the perpetrators of these crimes of witchcraft, apostasy, and magic: to be joined with the people of Roy and all at the expense of those convicted or, in case of insolvency, to those countries and places which will be instructed". Part of this admonition followed a request from the inhabitants of Amendeuix dating from 1587 who claimed to have been victims of "spells that were manifested mainly by evil barking".

The village of Oneix joined with Amendeuix to form the commune of Amendeuix-Oneix on 27 August 1846.

Heraldry

Administration

List of Successive Mayors

Inter-Communality
The commune belongs to seven inter-communal structures:
the Communauté d'agglomération du Pays Basque
the AEP Association for Mixe country
the sanitation association for Saint-Palais - Luxe-Sumberraute
the association for school buses of Amendeuix-Oneix and Gabat
the energy association for Pyrénées-Atlantiques;
the inter-communal association for the operation of schools in Amikuze
the association to support Basque culture

Demography
In 1350 nine fires were reported in Oneix and 15-18 in Amendeuix.

The fiscal census of 1412-1413, made on the orders of Charles III of Navarre, compared with that of 1551 men and weapons that are in this kingdom of Navarre this side of the ports, reveals a demography with strong growth. The first census indicated the presence of 13 fires in Amendeuix with the second showing 40 (33 + 7 secondary fires). The same census reported 8 fires in Oneix in 1412-1413 against 17 (14 + 3 secondary fires) in 1551.

The census of the population of Lower Navarre in 1695 counted 63 fires at Amendeuix and 20 at Oneix.

In 2017 the commune had 448 inhabitants. The population data given in the table and graph below include the former commune of Oneix.

Economy
The commune is part of the Appellation d'origine contrôlée (AOC) zone of Ossau-iraty.

Culture and Heritage

Languages
According to the Map of the Seven Basque Provinces published in 1863 by Prince Louis-Lucien Bonaparte the dialect of Basque spoken in Amendeuix-Oneix is eastern low Navarrese.

Religious heritage

Two churches in the commune are registered as historical monuments:
The Church of Saint Peter (1787) at Oneix.
The Church of Saint John the Baptist (1903) at Amendeuix.

Amenities

Education
The commune has a kindergarten.
 
Amendeuix, Gabat, Ilharre, and Labets-Biscay have partnered to create an inter-educational grouping (RPI).

See also
Communes of the Pyrénées-Atlantiques department

References

External links
in the Bernardo Estornés Lasa - Auñamendi Encyclopedia (Euskomedia Fundazioa) 
Amenduix and Oneix on the 1750 Cassini Map

Communes of Pyrénées-Atlantiques
Lower Navarre